The 2013 Bhutan National League started on 14 September 2013 and ended on 23 November 2013 and was the second time that a true national league competition was held in Bhutan, following from the inaugural season the previous year. Again the A-Division served as a qualifying round for teams based in Thimpu, who were then joined by regional teams for the national stage. Yeedzin won the A-Division, but were beaten into second place in the National League by Ugyen Academy.

A-Division
The 2013 tournament started on 19 May 2013 and ended on 15 June 2013. Yeedzin FC qualified along with Thimphu City (known in previous seasons as Zimdra) and Dzongree. Dzongree were meant to play-off against Druk Pol (who were exempted from the A-Division competition as, being the national police force team, they were on duty during the Bhutan elections) for the final berth in the National League, but the playoff did not take place and both teams entered the National League. Druk United and Druk Star entered a round robin relegation play-of competition with the top two teams in the B-Division, Motithang FC and BMW FC. The full results are not known but it appears that either the two A-Division teams were successful or the round robin was not completed as both teams participated in the A-Division the following season.

League table

Results

National League

Teams

A total of six teams competed in the league: three teams representing Thimphu, and three teams representing other districts.
Yeedzin (winners of the 2013 A-Division)
Thimphu City (runners-up in the 2013 A-Division)
Dzongree (third place in the 2013 A-Division)
Druk Pol (excused from the 2013 A-Division as on election duty)
Ugyen Academy (representing Punakha District)
Phuentsholing (representing Chukha District)

League table

Results

References

Bhutan National League seasons
Bhutan
Bhutan
1